The 2007 Maine Black Bears football team was an American football team that represented the University of Maine as a member of the Colonial Athletic Association (CAA) during the 2007 NCAA Division I FCS football season. In their 15th season under head coach Jack Cosgrove, the Black Bears compiled a 4–7 record (3–5 against conference opponents) and finished fourth in the CAA's North Division. John Wormuth, Patrick McCrossan, and Bruno Dorismond were the team captains.

Schedule

References

Maine
Maine Black Bears football seasons
Maine Black Bears football